Bisulepin is strong and relatively selective antihistamine (H1 antagonist) with hypnotic, antiadrenergic and very weak anticholinergic and antiserotonergic effects. Bisulepin is marketed in the Czech Republic and Slovakia under the trademark Dithiaden as tablets and injections.

The registered active form is the trans- (i.e. E-) isomer.

See also 
 Dosulepin
 Doxepin

References

External links
 Chemical data for bisulepin hydrochloride

H1 receptor antagonists
Thiepines
Thiophenes
Antihistamines